So What is a live album by George Russell released on the Blue Note label in 1987, featuring performances by Russell with his Living Time Orchestra recorded in 1983 in Boston. The Allmusic review by Richard S. Ginell awarded the album 3 stars and states "These tracks were recorded at the same Boston church concert that yielded The African Game, and Russell's Living Time Orchestra responds with the same kick and enthusiasm, although the musicians' individual solo turns aren't terribly startling... further evidence of Russell's (mixed?) desire to come to terms with the idioms of his time".

Track listing
All compositions by George Russell except as indicated
 "So What" (Miles Davis) - 7:57    
 "Time Spiral" - 6:27 
 "Rhymes" (Carla Bley) - 5:13      
 "War Gewesen" (David Baker) - 19:23  
Recorded live at Emmanuel Church, Boston, Massachusetts, June 18, 1983.

Personnel
George Russell - conductor, arranger
Marc Rossi - keyboards 
Gary Joynes - tenor saxophone, soprano saxophone, flute
Janis Steprans - alto saxophone, soprano saxophone, flute
Mark Hervey - trumpet 
Chip Kaner - trombone  
Mark White - guitar
Bill Urmson - fender bass  
Keith Copeland - drums  
Bruce Barth - keyboards (tracks 1 & 2)       
George Garzone - tenor saxophone, soprano saxophone (tracks 1 & 2)
Dave Mann - alto saxophone, soprano saxophone, flute (tracks 1 & 2)
Brad Jones - baritone saxophone, bass clarinet, flute (tracks 1 & 2)
Mike Peipman, Chris Passin, Roy Okutani - trumpet (tracks 1 & 2) 
Peter Cirelli - trombone (tracks 1 & 2)  
Jeff Marsanskas - bass trombone (tracks 1 & 2)  
Marshall Sealy - french horn (tracks 1 & 2)
Bob Nieske - acoustic bass (tracks 1 & 2)
Dave Hagedorn - percussion (tracks 1 & 2)
Joe Galeota - congas (tracks 1 & 2)

References

George Russell (composer) live albums
1987 live albums
Blue Note Records live albums